The Macau United Citizens Association is a political party in Macau.

In the 2005 legislative election, the party won 16.6 percent of the popular vote and 2 of the 12 popularly elected seats.

Elected members
 Chan Meng Kam, 2005–present (co-owner of U Wa and shareholder in Pearl Oriental Enterprises Limited)
 Ung Choi Kun, 2005–2013
 Si Ka Lom, 2013–present
 Song Pek Kei, 2013–present

See also
 :Category:Macau United Citizens Association politicians

References

Political parties in Macau
Conservative parties in China